Across the Blue Sea (Priko sinjeg mora) is a 1979 Croatian film directed by Ljiljana Jojić, starring Pavle Vuisić, Antoanela Marinović and Dino Dvornik.

The film was selected for preservation by the Croatian State Archives.

References

External links
 

1979 films
Croatian fantasy films
1970s Croatian-language films
Yugoslav fantasy adventure films
Zagreb Film films
1979 directorial debut films
Croatian adventure films